This is a list of crossings of Rondout Creek, a tributary of the Hudson River in Ulster and Sullivan counties in New York, USA.

Bridges in Ulster County, New York
Rondout